Lodi may refer to the following places in the U.S. state of Michigan:

Lodi, Kalkaska County, Michigan, an unincorporated community in Kalkaska County
Lodi Township, Michigan in Washtenaw County
Lodi, Washtenaw County, Michigan, historic settlement within the township